Daya Prakash Sinha, also known as D. P. Sinha, is an Indian retired IAS officer, currently serving as the national convener for BJP Cultural Cell and vice-president of Indian Council for Cultural Relations (ICCR). He is also a director, writer, dramatist and playwright, known for his Hindi plays such as Samraat Ashok, Seedhiyan, Katha Ek Kans Ki, Itihas Chakra and Rakt Abhishek. He is a recipient of Padma Shri, the fourth-highest civilian award in the Republic of India. His theatrical works have been published and staged for 50 years and translated into many languages.

Career

Civil service 

Sinha was born in Allahabad. After earning a master's degree, he continued to study for government exams. He couldn't clear the UPSC examination and joined Provincial Civil Service in 1952. Where he was promoted to IAS for Uttar Pradesh. In 1993, he retired as a director of cultural affairs. During his 4-decade long tenure, he held many cultural positions and promoted performing arts in India. He also served as the chairman of Lalit Kala Akademi, Uttar Pradesh from 1986 to 1988.

Theatrical literature 

He developed an interest in theater from a young age. He started his performing arts career as an actor in a Laxminarayan Lal's play, Taj Mahal ke aanso. Soon he debuted in playwriting and composed thirteen plays, including Mere Bhai Mere, Itihaas Chakra, Man Ke Bhanvar, Panchtantra, and Dushman, many of which were staged by theatrical directors. His first drama titled SanjhSavere was published in 1957. He married a theater artist in 1962 and continued writing and doing theater. His play Katha Ek Kans Ki was prescribed in the syllabuses of 5 universities of India, including University of Delhi. In 1978, he lost his wife.

In 2019, his collection of plays was launched in three volumes under the title Natya-Samagra in the presence of Culture and Tourism Minister, Prahlad Singh Patel at the Sahitya Akademi Auditorium.

Awards 

 Sahitya Academy Award 2021 for Samraat Ashok.
 Padma Shri for his contributions in the field of Arts
 Sangeet Natak Akademi Award
 Lohia Sahitya Samman by the then Prime Minister, Atal Behari Vajpayee
 Sardar Vallabh Bhai Patel Award
 Chaman Lal Memorial Award for Lifetime Achievement in theater

Selected books 

 Saadar Aapka - 
 Dusman Urf Sainya Magan Pahalwani Mein - 
 Samrat Ashok - 
 Hasya Ekanki - 
 Itihas - 
 Man Ke Bhanwar - 
 Seeriyaa - 
 Oh America! -

References

External links 
 Daya Prakash Sinha

Hindi-language writers
Indian male dramatists and playwrights
20th-century Indian dramatists and playwrights
20th-century Indian male writers
Year of birth missing (living people)
Living people
Recipients of the Sahitya Akademi Award in Hindi
Recipients of the Sangeet Natak Akademi Award